Hirota (written: 廣田, 広田, 弘田 or 弘太) is a Japanese surname. Notable people with the surname include:

Aika Hirota (born 1999), Japanese idol singer (Shiritsu Ebisu Chugaku)
Dennis Hirota (born 1946), American Buddhist
, Japanese politician
, Japanese trampoline gymnast
, Japanese diplomat, politician and 32nd Prime Minister of Japan
, Japanese voice actor
, Japanese singer
, Japanese mixed martial artist
, Japanese actress
, Japanese footballer
, Japanese composer
Saeko Hirota, Japanese table tennis player
, Japanese golfer
Sayaka Hirota (廣田 彩花, born 1994), Japanese badminton player
, Japanese painter
Tomokazu Hirota (born 1976), Japanese drifter
, Japanese video game composer

Japanese-language surnames